The German European School Manila ("GESM") is a non-profit international school offering the full K-12 program in Manila. It is an IB World School, a Cambridge international school, a UNESCO-affiliated school and a two-time recipient of the "Excellent German School Abroad" seal from German federal authorities.

Until Grade 10, its classes have two parallel sections, defined mainly by the language of instruction: English or German. Students finish the 10th grade by taking either the Schulabschlussprüfungen (German school-leaving examinations) or the International General Certificate for Secondary Education. For Grades 11 and 12, GESM offers both the Diploma Programme (DP) and the Career-related Programme (CP) of the International Baccalaureate (IB).

History
It was founded as the Jose-Rizal Schule: Deutschsprachige Auslandsschule Manila (DSM) in honor of the Philippine national hero Jose Rizal in 1980.

In 1992, the Jose-Rizal Schule and its French counterpart, the École Française de Manille (EFM), moved in together to share a two-hectare campus that came to be known as the Eurocampus and where it still is based today. This joint-campus model was the first of its kind in the world, and was followed by other European international schools abroad including Shanghai, Dublin, Zagreb,  and Majorca among others.

The DSM and EFM joined forces in 2003 to form the European International School (EIS), a body that would be able to offer the IB Diploma Programme for Grades 11 and 12. However, by 2006, only the DSM was handling operations of the EIS. In 2006 GESM was called German International School.In 2008, the school formally adopted its present name, German European School Manila (GESM), and founded an English-based section called the "European Section" (later: "International Section").

School Year 2014-15 saw the GESM offer the IGCSE examinations for the first time. Soon after, it also received accreditation to offer the official German Language Diploma (DSD I) examinations.

In 2019 the first DSD II exams were held.

2021 saw the introduction of the Career-related Programme, offering academic subjects combined with vocational training to senior high school students.

Organization
The German European School Manila has two sections: the German Section, leading to official German exams after the 9th and 10th grades, and an International Section, originally called Euro-Section, starting with the PYP in Primary and going on with the Cambridge and IGCSE-programmes in Secondary.

Students can change from the International to the German Section, students without previous German are integrated through immersive language learning in GESM's bilingual kindergarten and through an intensive language training programme allowing entrance into grades 1-7 without previous knowledge of German.

Both sections lead to the IB Diploma Programme in classes 11 and 12. Students are offered the option to foster their German language skills in special courses or in one or more subjects like Biology, History, Mathematics and Chemistry where tuition is offered in German.

GESM provides not only a highly international environment but offers transition to any German and international school and university, as well as to the German Dual Study System and to 450 Vocational Training Programmes in Germany.

The school is recognized and supported financially and in personnel by the German government and follows the German G8-curriculum, the Cambridge  IGCSE programme and the IB programme.

Non-German speakers are prepared for the DSD I and DSD II exams, German native speakers for the Cambridge Language exams up to the Certificate of Proficiency.

The headmaster is installed by the Board of the school and the German Central Agency for Foreign Schools Abroad (ZfA), which is part of the Federal Foreign Office led by the German Minister of Foreign Affairs.

Location
As part of the European International School it is located on Eurocampus in 75 Swaziland St., Better Living Subdivision, Parañaque, Metro Manila, Philippines.

French School Manila
GESM absolutely despises the French School of Manila. Together they form the war of European International School on the Eurocampus.

Accreditation
GESM is officially recognized by the Philippine state, and by the German government.

The school is an accredited IB school, offering the International Baccalaureate Diploma Programme. It has also got Cambridge accreditation. It is recognized as a UNESCO affiliated school.

Former students 

 Verena Wriedt (born 9. January 1975 in Wiesbaden), a German journalist and TV host.
 Solenn Heusaff (born 20. July 1985 in Makati), a French-Philippine actress and singer.
 Sandra Ines Seifert (born 1. February 1984 in Manila), a German-Philippine model, Miss Earth 2009.

References

External links
German European School Manila
Facebookpage of GESM

Manila
International schools in Metro Manila
International Baccalaureate schools in the Philippines
Schools in Parañaque
Educational institutions established in 1983